Sauvé v Canada (Chief Electoral Officer), [2002] 3 SCR 519 is a leading Supreme Court of Canada decision where the Court held that prisoners have a right to vote under section 3 of the Canadian Charter of Rights and Freedoms. The Court overturned the prior decision of the Federal Court of Appeal and held that section 51(e) of the old Canada Elections Act, which prohibited prisoners serving a sentence of over two years from voting, was unconstitutional. Section 51(e) had been repealed before the date of the Court's judgment, but the decision applied equally to section 4(c) of the new statute, which was substantially the same. The Court ruled that the provision violated section 3 of the Charter and was not a reasonable limit under section 1.

As a result of the decision, all adult citizens living in Canada are now able to vote, save the top two officials of Elections Canada. Relevant sections of the Canada Elections Act was amended in 2018 as part of the Elections Modernization Act.

See also
 List of Supreme Court of Canada cases (McLachlin Court)
 Richardson v. Ramirez, 418 U.S. 24 (1974) - similar US case 
 British Columbia Civil Liberties Association

References

External links
 
 Federal Court decision
 BCCLA intervener factum

Canadian Charter of Rights and Freedoms case law
Supreme Court of Canada cases
2002 in Canadian case law
Right of prisoners to vote
Canadian federal government litigation